Ildemaro de Jesús Fernández Uzcátegui (born 27 December 1961) is a Venezuelan football coach and former player who played as a forward. He is the current assistant manager of Estudiantes de Mérida.

References

1961 births
Living people
Venezuelan footballers
Estudiantes de Mérida players
A.C.C.D. Mineros de Guayana players
Association football forwards
Venezuela international footballers
Venezuelan football managers
Estudiantes de Mérida managers
People from Mérida, Mérida